Allen Branch is a stream in Lewis County, Missouri, United States. It is a tributary of Troublesome Creek.

Allen Branch has the name of N. E. Allen, the original owner of the site.

Course
Allen Branch rises about 2 miles north of Steffenville, Missouri, and then flows generally southeast to join Troublesome Creek about 4 miles east-southeast of Steffenville.

Watershed
Allen Branch drains  of area, receives about 36.9 in/year of precipitation, has a wetness index of 417.88, and is about 22% forested.

See also
List of rivers of Missouri

References

Rivers of Lewis County, Missouri
Rivers of Missouri
Upper Mississippi water resource region